SS Sołdek is a retired Polish coal and ore freighter. She was the first ship built in Gdańsk (Poland) after World War II and the first seagoing ship completed in Poland. She was the first of 29 ships classed as Project B30, built between 1949 and 1954 in Stocznia Gdańska (Gdańsk Shipyard). The name was given in honour of Stanisław Sołdek, one of the shipyard's shock workers.

Sołdek is oftently mistaken with the SS Oliwa (a former unfinished Hansa A type cargo ship), which was commissioned after Sołdek, however which's hull was already constructed in 1944. It was abandoned by the Germans on a slipway in Szczecin, and seized by Poland. Following this the hull was completed and the ship launched as Oliwa. Later she was renamed and entered service in 1951 as Marchlewski, serving the Polish Ocean Lines. Many sources incorrectly state that Oliwa was Sołdek's makeshift name during her launch, and that she was later relaunched again as Sołdek.

The ship is currently preserved as a museum ship in Gdańsk, as a part of National Maritime Museum collection.

The ship was used in the movie Persona Non Grata as a Japanese steamer transporting Jews from Vladivostok to Tsuraga.

Other B30 ships

Polish
Sołdek (shipyard number B30/1)
Jedność Robotnicza (B30/2)
Brygada Makowskiego (B30/3)
1 Maj (B30/4) (sold to the USSR as Pervomaysk)
Pstrowski (B30/5)
Wieczorek (B30/6)

Built for the USSR
(B30/7) - Zaporozhe
(B30/8) - Krivoy Rog
(B30/9) - Kramatorsk
(B30/10) - Makeevka
(B30/11) - Gorlovka
(B30/12) - Novo- Shahtinsk
(B30/13) - Solikamsk
(B30/14) - Kurgan
(B30/15) - Zlatoust
(B30/16) - Minusinsk
(B30/17) - Pavlodar
(B30/18) - Jenakiyevo
(B30/19) - Nikitovka
(B30/20) - Novocherkassk
(B30/21) - Volnovacha
(B30/22) - Vitegra
(B30/23) - Tovda
(B30/24) - Kalar
(B30/25) - Azovstal
(B30/26) - Tkvarcheli
(B30/27) - Zangenzur
(B30/28) - Malaia Zemlia
(B30/29) - Pereyeslav Khmielnitsky

A number of B-30 ships saw service for the Soviet Navy, as auxiliary vessels (e. g. transports), including the "Tovda" and the "Vitegra". Corresponding data (including side plan) can be found i. a. in Weyer's Flottentaschenbuch 1971/72.

References

External links

 The museum-ship "Soldek"

Gallery 

1948 ships
Ships built in Gdańsk
Merchant ships of Poland
Museum ships in Poland
Museums in Gdańsk
Science and technology in Poland